Niccolò di Bernardo dei Machiavelli (3 May 1469 – 21 June 1527), was an Italian diplomat, author, philosopher and historian who lived during the Renaissance. He is best known for his political treatise The Prince (Il Principe), written around 1513 but not published until 1532. He has often been called the father of modern political philosophy and political science.

For many years he served as a senior official in the Florentine Republic with responsibilities in diplomatic and military affairs. He wrote comedies, carnival songs, and poetry. His personal correspondence is also important to historians and scholars of Italian correspondence. He worked as secretary to the Second Chancery of the Republic of Florence from 1498 to 1512, when the Medici were out of power.

After his death Machiavelli's name came to evoke unscrupulous acts of the sort he advised most famously in his work, The Prince. He claimed that his experience and reading of history showed him that politics have always been played with deception, treachery, and crime. He also notably said that a ruler who is establishing a kingdom or a republic, and is criticized for his deeds, including violence, should be excused when the intention and the result are beneficial to him. Machiavelli's Prince has been surrounded by controversy since its release. Some consider it to be a straightforward description of political reality. Others view the Prince as a manual, teaching would-be tyrants how they should seize and maintain power. Even into recent times, some scholars, such as Leo Strauss, have restated the traditional opinion that Machiavelli was a "teacher of evil".

The term Machiavellian often connotes political deceit, deviousness, and realpolitik. Even though Machiavelli has become most famous for his work on principalities, scholars also give attention to the exhortations in his other works of political philosophy. While much less well known than The Prince, the Discourses on Livy (composed ) has been said to have paved the way of modern republicanism. His works were a major influence on Enlightenment authors who revived interest in classical republicanism, such as Jean-Jacques Rousseau and James Harrington. Machiavelli's political realism has continued to influence generations of academics and politicians, including Hannah Arendt and Otto von Bismarck.

Life 

Machiavelli was born in Florence, Italy, the third child and first son of attorney Bernardo di Niccolò Machiavelli and his wife, Bartolomea di Stefano Nelli. The Machiavelli family is believed to be descended from the old marquesses of Tuscany and to have produced thirteen Florentine Gonfalonieres of Justice, one of the offices of a group of nine citizens selected by drawing lots every two months and who formed the government, or Signoria; he was never, though, a full citizen of Florence because of the nature of Florentine citizenship in that time even under the republican regime. Machiavelli married Marietta Corsini in 1502.

Machiavelli was born in a tumultuous era. The Italian city-states, and the families and individuals who ran them could rise and fall suddenly, as popes and the kings of France, Spain, and the Holy Roman Empire waged acquisitive wars for regional influence and control. Political-military alliances continually changed, featuring condottieri (mercenary leaders), who changed sides without warning, and the rise and fall of many short-lived governments.

Machiavelli was taught grammar, rhetoric, and Latin, by his teacher, Paolo da Ronciglione. It is unknown whether Machiavelli knew Greek even though Florence was at the time one of the centers of Greek scholarship in Europe. In 1494 Florence restored the republic, expelling the Medici family that had ruled Florence for some sixty years. Shortly after the execution of Savonarola, Machiavelli was appointed to an office of the second chancery, a medieval writing office that put Machiavelli in charge of the production of official Florentine government documents. Shortly thereafter, he was also made the secretary of the Dieci di Libertà e Pace.

In the first decade of the sixteenth century, he carried out several diplomatic missions, most notably to the Papacy in Rome. Florence sent him to Pistoia to pacify the leaders of two opposing factions which had broken into riots in 1501 and 1502; when this failed, the leaders were banished from the city, a strategy which Machiavelli had favored from the outset. From 1502 to 1503, he witnessed the brutal reality of the state-building methods of Cesare Borgia (1475–1507) and his father, Pope Alexander VI, who were then engaged in the process of trying to bring a large part of Central Italy under their possession. The pretext of defending Church interests was used as a partial justification by the Borgias. Other excursions to the court of Louis XII and the Spanish court influenced his writings such as The Prince.

At the start of the 16th century, Machiavelli conceived of a militia for Florence, and he then began recruiting and creating it. He distrusted mercenaries (a distrust that he explained in his official reports and then later in his theoretical works for their unpatriotic and uninvested nature in the war that makes their allegiance fickle and often unreliable when most needed), and instead staffed his army with citizens, a policy that was to be repeatedly successful. By February 1506 he was able to have marching on parade four hundred farmers, suited (including iron breastplates), and armed with lances and small fire arms. Under his command, Florentine citizen-soldiers defeated Pisa in 1509.

Machiavelli's success did not last. In August 1512, the Medici, backed by Pope Julius II, used Spanish troops to defeat the Florentines at Prato. In the wake of the siege, Soderini resigned as Florentine head of state and left in exile. The experience would, like Machiavelli's time in foreign courts and with the Borgia, heavily influence his political writings.
The Florentine city-state and the republic were dissolved, and Machiavelli was deprived of office and banished from the city for a year. In 1513, the Medici accused him of conspiracy against them and had him imprisoned. Despite being subjected to torture ("with the rope", in which the prisoner is hanged from his bound wrists from the back, forcing the arms to bear the body's weight and dislocating the shoulders), he denied involvement and was released after three weeks.

Machiavelli then retired to his farm estate at Sant'Andrea in Percussina, near San Casciano in Val di Pesa, where he devoted himself to studying and writing his political treatises. He visited places in France, Germany, and Italy where he had represented the Florentine republic. Despairing of the opportunity to remain directly involved in political matters, after a time, he began to participate in intellectual groups in Florence and wrote several plays that (unlike his works on political theory) were both popular and widely known in his lifetime. Politics remained his main passion and, to satisfy this interest, he maintained a well-known correspondence with more politically connected friends, attempting to become involved once again in political life. In a letter to Francesco Vettori, he described his experience:

When evening comes, I go back home, and go to my study. On the threshold, I take off my work clothes, covered in mud and filth, and I put on the clothes an ambassador would wear. Decently dressed, I enter the ancient courts of rulers who have long since died. There, I am warmly welcomed, and I feed on the only food I find nourishing and was born to savour. I am not ashamed to talk to them and ask them to explain their actions and they, out of kindness, answer me. Four hours go by without my feeling any anxiety. I forget every worry. I am no longer afraid of poverty or frightened of death. I live entirely through them.

Machiavelli died on 21 June 1527 at the age of 58 after receiving his last rites. He was buried at the Church of Santa Croce in Florence. In 1789 George Nassau Clavering, and Pietro Leopoldo, Grand Duke of Tuscany, initiated the construction of a monument on Machiavelli's tomb. It was sculpted by Innocenzo Spinazzi, with an epitaph by Doctor Ferroni inscribed on it.

Major works

The Prince
 

Machiavelli's best-known book Il Principe contains several maxims concerning politics. Instead of the more traditional target audience of a hereditary prince, it concentrates on the possibility of a "new prince". To retain power, the hereditary prince must carefully balance the interests of a variety of institutions to which the people are accustomed. By contrast, a new prince has the more difficult task in ruling: He must first stabilise his newfound power in order to build an enduring political structure. Machiavelli suggests that the social benefits of stability and security can be achieved in the face of moral corruption. Machiavelli believed that public and private morality had to be understood as two different things in order to rule well. As a result, a ruler must be concerned not only with reputation, but also must be positively willing to act unscrupulously at the right times. Machiavelli believed that,  for a ruler, it was better to be widely feared than to be greatly loved; a loved ruler retains authority by obligation, while a feared leader rules by fear of punishment.  As a political theorist, Machiavelli emphasized the "necessity" for the methodical exercise of brute force or deceit, including extermination of entire noble families, to head off any chance of a challenge to the prince's authority.

Scholars often note that Machiavelli glorifies instrumentality in state building, an approach embodied by the saying, often attributed to interpretations of The Prince, "The ends justify the means". Fraud and deceit are held by Machiavelli as necessary for a prince to use. Violence may be necessary for the successful stabilization of power and introduction of new political institutions. Force may be used to eliminate political rivals, to destroy resistant populations, and to purge the community of other men strong enough of a character to rule, who will inevitably attempt to replace the ruler. Machiavelli has become infamous for such political advice, ensuring that he would be remembered in history through the adjective, "Machiavellian".

Due to the treatise's controversial analysis on politics, the Catholic Church banned The Prince, putting it on the Index Librorum Prohibitorum. Humanists also viewed the book negatively, including Erasmus of Rotterdam. As a treatise, its primary intellectual contribution to the history of political thought is the fundamental break between political realism and political idealism, due to it being a manual on acquiring and keeping political power. In contrast with Plato and Aristotle, Machiavelli insisted that an imaginary ideal society is not a model by which a prince should orient himself.

Concerning the differences and similarities in Machiavelli's advice to ruthless and tyrannical princes in The Prince and his more republican exhortations in Discourses on Livy, a few commentators assert that The Prince, although written as advice for a monarchical prince, contains arguments for the superiority of republican regimes, similar to those found in the Discourses. In the 18th century, the work was even called a satire, for example by Jean-Jacques Rousseau.

Scholars such as Leo Strauss and Harvey Mansfield have stated that sections of The Prince and his other works have deliberately esoteric statements throughout them. However, Mansfield states that this is the result of Machiavelli's seeing grave and serious things as humorous because they are "manipulable by men", and sees them as grave because they "answer human necessities".

Another interpretation is that of Antonio Gramsci, who argued that Machiavelli's audience for this work was not even the ruling class, but the common people, because rulers already knew these methods through their education.

Discourses on Livy

The Discourses on the First Ten Books of Titus Livius, written around 1517, published in 1531, often referred to simply as the Discourses or Discorsi, is nominally a discussion regarding the classical history of early Ancient Rome, although it strays very far from this subject matter and also uses contemporary political examples to illustrate points. Machiavelli presents it as a series of lessons on how a republic should be started and structured. It is a much larger work than The Prince, and while it more openly explains the advantages of republics, it also contains many similar themes from his other works. For example, Machiavelli has noted that to save a republic from corruption, it is necessary to return it to a "kingly state" using violent means. He excuses Romulus for murdering his brother Remus and co-ruler Titus Tatius to gain absolute power for himself in that he established a "civil way of life". Commentators disagree about how much the two works agree with each other, as Machiavelli frequently refers to leaders of republics as "princes". Machiavelli even sometimes acts as an advisor to tyrants. Other scholars have pointed out the aggrandizing and imperialistic features of Machiavelli's republic. Nevertheless, it became one of the central texts of modern republicanism, and has often been argued to be a more comprehensive work than The Prince.

Originality 

Commentators have taken very different approaches to Machiavelli and not always agreed. Major discussion has tended to be about two issues: first, how unified and philosophical his work is, and second, concerning how innovative or traditional it is.

Coherence 
There is some disagreement concerning how best to describe the unifying themes, if there are any, that can be found in Machiavelli's works, especially in the two major political works, The Prince and Discourses. Some commentators have described him as inconsistent, and perhaps as not even putting a high priority in consistency. Others such as Hans Baron have argued that his ideas must have changed dramatically over time. Some have argued that his conclusions are best understood as a product of his times, experiences and education. Others, such as Leo Strauss and Harvey Mansfield, have argued strongly that there is a very strong and deliberate consistency and distinctness, even arguing that this extends to all of Machiavelli's works including his comedies and letters.

Influences 
Commentators such as Leo Strauss have gone so far as to name Machiavelli as the deliberate originator of modernity itself. Others have argued that Machiavelli is only a particularly interesting example of trends which were happening around him. In any case Machiavelli presented himself at various times as someone reminding Italians of the old virtues of the Romans and Greeks, and other times as someone promoting a completely new approach to politics.

That Machiavelli had a wide range of influences is in itself not controversial. Their relative importance is however a subject of on-going discussion. It is possible to summarize some of the main influences emphasized by different commentators.

The Mirror of Princes genre

 summarized the similarities between The Prince and the genre it obviously imitates, the so-called "Mirror of Princes" style. This was a classically influenced genre, with models at least as far back as Xenophon and Isocrates. While Gilbert emphasized the similarities, however, he agreed with all other commentators that Machiavelli was particularly novel in the way he used this genre, even when compared to his contemporaries such as Baldassare Castiglione and Erasmus. One of the major innovations Gilbert noted was that Machiavelli focused upon the "deliberate purpose of dealing with a new ruler who will need to establish himself in defiance of custom". Normally, these types of works were addressed only to hereditary princes. (Xenophon is also an exception in this regard.)

Classical republicanism

Commentators such as Quentin Skinner and J.G.A. Pocock, in the so-called "Cambridge School" of interpretation, have asserted that some of the republican themes in Machiavelli's political works, particularly the Discourses on Livy, can be found in medieval Italian literature which was influenced by classical authors such as Sallust.

Classical political philosophy: Xenophon, Plato and Aristotle

The Socratic school of classical political philosophy, especially Aristotle, had become a major influence upon European political thinking in the late Middle Ages. It existed both in the Catholicised form presented by Thomas Aquinas, and in the more controversial "Averroist" form of authors like Marsilius of Padua. Machiavelli was critical of Catholic political thinking and may have been influenced by Averroism. But he rarely cites Plato and Aristotle, and most likely did not approve of them. Leo Strauss argued that the strong influence of Xenophon, a student of Socrates more known as an historian, rhetorician and soldier, was a major source of Socratic ideas for Machiavelli, sometimes not in line with Aristotle. While interest in Plato was increasing in Florence during Machiavelli's lifetime, Machiavelli does not show particular interest in him, but was indirectly influenced by his readings of authors such as Polybius, Plutarch and Cicero.

The major difference between Machiavelli and the Socratics, according to Strauss, is Machiavelli's materialism, and therefore his rejection of both a teleological view of nature and of the view that philosophy is higher than politics. With their teleological understanding of things, Socratics argued that by nature, everything that acts, acts towards some end, as if nature desired them, but Machiavelli claimed that such things happen by blind chance or human action.

Classical materialism

Strauss argued that Machiavelli may have seen himself as influenced by some ideas from classical materialists such as Democritus, Epicurus and Lucretius. Strauss however sees this also as a sign of major innovation in Machiavelli, because classical materialists did not share the Socratic regard for political life, while Machiavelli clearly did.

Thucydides

Some scholars note the similarity between Machiavelli and the Greek historian Thucydides, since both emphasized power politics. Strauss argued that Machiavelli may indeed have been influenced by pre-Socratic philosophers, but he felt it was a new combination:
...contemporary readers are reminded by Machiavelli's teaching of Thucydides; they find in both authors the same "realism," i.e., the same denial of the power of the gods or of justice and the same sensitivity to harsh necessity and elusive chance. Yet Thucydides never calls in question the intrinsic superiority of nobility to baseness, a superiority that shines forth particularly when the noble is destroyed by the base. Therefore Thucydides' History arouses in the reader a sadness which is never aroused by Machiavelli's books. In Machiavelli we find comedies, parodies, and satires but nothing reminding of tragedy. One half of humanity remains outside of his thought. There is no tragedy in Machiavelli because he has no sense of the sacredness of "the common." —

Beliefs 
Amongst commentators, there are a few consistently made proposals concerning what was most new in Machiavelli's work.

Empiricism and realism versus idealism 
Machiavelli is sometimes seen as the prototype of a modern empirical scientist, building generalizations from experience and historical facts, and emphasizing the uselessness of theorizing with the imagination.

Machiavelli felt that his early schooling along the lines of a traditional classical education was essentially useless for the purpose of understanding politics. Nevertheless, he advocated intensive study of the past, particularly regarding the founding of a city, which he felt was a key to understanding its later development. Moreover, he studied the way people lived and aimed to inform leaders how they should rule and even how they themselves should live. Machiavelli denies the classical opinion that living virtuously always leads to happiness. For example, Machiavelli viewed misery as "one of the vices that enables a prince to rule." Machiavelli stated that "it would be best to be both loved and feared. But since the two rarely come together, anyone compelled to choose will find greater security in being feared than in being loved." In much of Machiavelli's work, he often states that the ruler must adopt unsavory policies for the sake of the continuance of his regime.

A related and more controversial proposal often made is that he described how to do things in politics in a way which seemed neutral concerning who used the advice—tyrants or good rulers. That Machiavelli strove for realism is not doubted, but for four centuries scholars have debated how best to describe his morality. The Prince made the word Machiavellian a byword for deceit, despotism, and political manipulation. Leo Strauss declared himself inclined toward the traditional view that Machiavelli was self-consciously a "teacher of evil," since he counsels the princes to avoid the values of justice, mercy, temperance, wisdom, and love of their people in preference to the use of cruelty, violence, fear, and deception. Strauss takes up this opinion because he asserted that failure to accept the traditional opinion misses the "intrepidity of his thought" and "the graceful subtlety of his speech."  Italian anti-fascist philosopher Benedetto Croce (1925) concludes Machiavelli is simply a "realist" or "pragmatist" who accurately states that moral values in reality do not greatly affect the decisions that political leaders make. German philosopher Ernst Cassirer (1946) held that Machiavelli simply adopts the stance of a political scientist—a Galileo of politics—in distinguishing between the "facts" of political life and the "values" of moral judgment. On the other hand, Walter Russell Mead has argued that The Princes advice presupposes the importance of ideas like legitimacy in making changes to the political system.

Fortune 
Machiavelli is generally seen as being critical of Christianity as it existed in his time, specifically its effect upon politics, and also everyday life. In his opinion, Christianity, along with the teleological Aristotelianism that the Church had come to accept, allowed practical decisions to be guided too much by imaginary ideals and encouraged people to lazily leave events up to providence or, as he would put it, chance, luck or fortune. While Christianity sees modesty as a virtue and pride as sinful, Machiavelli took a more classical position, seeing ambition, spiritedness, and the pursuit of glory as good and natural things, and part of the virtue and prudence that good princes should have. Therefore, while it was traditional to say that leaders should have virtues, especially prudence, Machiavelli's use of the words virtù and prudenza was unusual for his time, implying a spirited and immodest ambition. Mansfield describes his usage of virtu as a "compromise with evil". Famously, Machiavelli argued that virtue and prudence can help a man control more of his future, in the place of allowing fortune to do so.

 has argued that this same approach can be found in Machiavelli's approach to love and desire, as seen in his comedies and correspondence. Najemy shows how Machiavelli's friend Vettori argued against Machiavelli and cited a more traditional understanding of fortune.

On the other hand, humanism in Machiavelli's time meant that classical pre-Christian ideas about virtue and prudence, including the possibility of trying to control one's future, were not unique to him. But humanists did not go so far as to promote the extra glory of deliberately aiming to establish a new state, in defiance of traditions and laws.

While Machiavelli's approach had classical precedents, it has been argued that it did more than just bring back old ideas and that Machiavelli was not a typical humanist.  argues that the way Machiavelli combines classical ideas is new. While Xenophon and Plato also described realistic politics and were closer to Machiavelli than Aristotle was, they, like Aristotle, also saw philosophy as something higher than politics. Machiavelli was apparently a materialist who objected to explanations involving formal and final causation, or teleology.

Machiavelli's promotion of ambition among leaders while denying any higher standard meant that he encouraged risk-taking, and innovation, most famously the founding of new modes and orders. His advice to princes was therefore certainly not limited to discussing how to maintain a state. It has been argued that Machiavelli's promotion of innovation led directly to the argument for progress as an aim of politics and civilization. But while a belief that humanity can control its own future, control nature, and "progress" has been long-lasting, Machiavelli's followers, starting with his own friend Guicciardini, have tended to prefer peaceful progress through economic development, and not warlike progress. As Harvey  wrote: "In attempting other, more regular and scientific modes of overcoming fortune, Machiavelli's successors formalized and emasculated his notion of virtue."

Machiavelli however, along with some of his classical predecessors, saw ambition and spiritedness, and therefore war, as inevitable and part of human nature.

Strauss concludes his 1958 book Thoughts on Machiavelli by proposing that this promotion of progress leads directly to the advent of new technologies being invented in both good and bad governments. Strauss argued that the unavoidable nature of such arms races, which have existed before modern times and led to the collapse of peaceful civilizations, show that classical minded men "had to admit in other words that in an important respect the good city has to take its bearings by the practice of bad cities or that the bad impose their law on the good."

Religion
Machiavelli shows repeatedly that he saw religion as man-made, and that the value of religion lies in its contribution to social order and the rules of morality must be dispensed with if security requires it. In The Prince, the Discourses and in the Life of Castruccio Castracani he describes "prophets", as he calls them, like Moses, Romulus, Cyrus the Great and Theseus (he treated pagan and Christian patriarchs in the same way) as the greatest of new princes, the glorious and brutal founders of the most novel innovations in politics, and men whom Machiavelli assures us have always used a large amount of armed force and murder against their own people. He estimated that these sects last from 1,666 to 3,000 years each time, which, as pointed out by Leo Strauss, would mean that Christianity became due to start finishing about 150 years after Machiavelli. Machiavelli's concern with Christianity as a sect was that it makes men weak and inactive, delivering politics into the hands of cruel and wicked men without a fight.

While fear of God can be replaced by fear of the prince, if there is a strong enough prince, Machiavelli felt that having a religion is in any case especially essential to keeping a republic in order. For Machiavelli, a truly great prince can never be conventionally religious himself, but he should make his people religious if he can. According to  he was not the first person to ever explain religion in this way, but his description of religion was novel because of the way he integrated this into his general account of princes.

Machiavelli's judgment that governments need religion for practical political reasons was widespread among modern proponents of republics until approximately the time of the French Revolution. This therefore represents a point of disagreement between Machiavelli and late modernity.

Positive side to factional and individual vice
Despite the classical precedents, which Machiavelli was not the only one to promote in his time, Machiavelli's realism and willingness to argue that good ends justify bad things, is seen as a critical stimulus towards some of the most important theories of modern politics.

Firstly, particularly in the Discourses on Livy, Machiavelli is unusual in the positive side he sometimes seems to describe in factionalism in republics. For example, quite early in the Discourses, (in Book I, chapter 4), a chapter title announces that the disunion of the plebs and senate in Rome "kept Rome free". That a community has different components whose interests must be balanced in any good regime is an idea with classical precedents, but Machiavelli's particularly extreme presentation is seen as a critical step towards the later political ideas of both a division of powers or checks and balances, ideas which lay behind the US constitution, as well as many other modern state constitutions.

Similarly, the modern economic argument for capitalism, and most modern forms of economics, was often stated in the form of "public virtue from private vices." Also in this case, even though there are classical precedents, Machiavelli's insistence on being both realistic and ambitious, not only admitting that vice exists but being willing to risk encouraging it, is a critical step on the path to this insight.

Mansfield however argues that Machiavelli's own aims have not been shared by those he influenced. Machiavelli argued against seeing mere peace and economic growth as worthy aims on their own, if they would lead to what Mansfield calls the "taming of the prince."

Influence

To quote Robert Bireley:

Machiavelli's ideas had a profound impact on political leaders throughout the modern west, helped by the new technology of the printing press. During the first generations after Machiavelli, his main influence was in non-republican governments. Pole reported that The Prince was spoken of highly by Thomas Cromwell in England and had influenced Henry VIII in his turn towards Protestantism, and in his tactics, for example during the Pilgrimage of Grace. A copy was also possessed by the Catholic king and emperor Charles V. In France, after an initially mixed reaction, Machiavelli came to be associated with Catherine de' Medici and the St. Bartholomew's Day massacre. As  reports, in the 16th century, Catholic writers "associated Machiavelli with the Protestants, whereas Protestant authors saw him as Italian and Catholic". In fact, he was apparently influencing both Catholic and Protestant kings.

One of the most important early works dedicated to criticism of Machiavelli, especially The Prince, was that of the Huguenot, Innocent Gentillet, whose work commonly referred to as Discourse against Machiavelli or Anti Machiavel was published in Geneva in 1576. He accused Machiavelli of being an atheist and accused politicians of his time by saying that his works were the "Koran of the courtiers", that "he is of no reputation in the court of France which hath not Machiavel's writings at the fingers ends". Another theme of Gentillet was more in the spirit of Machiavelli himself: he questioned the effectiveness of immoral strategies (just as Machiavelli had himself done, despite also explaining how they could sometimes work). This became the theme of much future political discourse in Europe during the 17th century. This includes the Catholic Counter Reformation writers summarised by Bireley: Giovanni Botero, Justus Lipsius, Carlo Scribani, Adam Contzen, Pedro de Ribadeneira, and Diego de Saavedra Fajardo. These authors criticized Machiavelli, but also followed him in many ways. They accepted the need for a prince to be concerned with reputation, and even a need for cunning and deceit, but compared to Machiavelli, and like later modernist writers, they emphasized economic progress much more than the riskier ventures of war. These authors tended to cite Tacitus as their source for realist political advice, rather than Machiavelli, and this pretense came to be known as "Tacitism". "Black tacitism" was in support of princely rule, but "red tacitism" arguing the case for republics, more in the original spirit of Machiavelli himself, became increasingly important.

Modern materialist philosophy developed in the 16th, 17th and 18th centuries, starting in the generations after Machiavelli. This philosophy tended to be republican, but as with the Catholic authors, Machiavelli's realism and encouragement of using innovation to try to control one's own fortune were more accepted than his emphasis upon war and factional violence. Not only was innovative economics and politics a result, but also modern science, leading some commentators to say that the 18th century Enlightenment involved a "humanitarian" moderating of Machiavellianism.

The importance of Machiavelli's influence is notable in many important figures in this endeavor, for example Bodin, Francis Bacon, Algernon Sidney, Harrington, John Milton, Spinoza, Rousseau, Hume, Edward Gibbon, and Adam Smith. Although he was not always mentioned by name as an inspiration, due to his controversy, he is also thought to have been an influence for other major philosophers, such as Montaigne, Descartes, Hobbes, Locke and Montesquieu.

Although Jean-Jacques Rousseau is associated with very different political ideas he was also influenced by him, although he viewed Machiavelli's work as a satirical piece in which Machiavelli exposes the faults of a one-man rule rather than exalting amorality.

In the seventeenth century it was in England that Machiavelli's ideas were most substantially developed and adapted, and that republicanism came once more to life; and out of seventeenth-century English republicanism there were to emerge in the next century not only a theme of English political and historical reflection—of the writings of the Bolingbroke circle and of Gibbon and of early parliamentary radicals—but a stimulus to the Enlightenment in Scotland, on the Continent, and in America.

Scholars have argued that Machiavelli was a major indirect and direct influence upon the political thinking of the Founding Fathers of the United States due to his overwhelming favoritism of republicanism and the republican type of government. According to John McCormick, it is still very much debatable whether or not Machiavelli was "an advisor of tyranny or partisan of liberty." Benjamin Franklin, James Madison and Thomas Jefferson followed Machiavelli's republicanism when they opposed what they saw as the emerging aristocracy that they feared Alexander Hamilton was creating with the Federalist Party. Hamilton learned from Machiavelli about the importance of foreign policy for domestic policy, but may have broken from him regarding how rapacious a republic needed to be in order to survive. George Washington was less influenced by Machiavelli.

The Founding Father who perhaps most studied and valued Machiavelli as a political philosopher was John Adams, who profusely commented on the Italian's thought in his work, A Defence of the Constitutions of Government of the United States of America. In this work, John Adams praised Machiavelli, with Algernon Sidney and Montesquieu, as a philosophic defender of mixed government. For Adams, Machiavelli restored empirical reason to politics, while his analysis of factions was commendable. Adams likewise agreed with the Florentine that human nature was immutable and driven by passions. He also accepted Machiavelli's belief that all societies were subject to cyclical periods of growth and decay. For Adams, Machiavelli lacked only a clear understanding of the institutions necessary for good government.

20th century
The 20th-century Italian Communist Antonio Gramsci drew great inspiration from Machiavelli's writings on ethics, morals, and how they relate to the State and revolution in his writings on Passive Revolution, and how a society can be manipulated by controlling popular notions of morality.

Joseph Stalin read The Prince and annotated his own copy.

In the 20th century there was also renewed interest in Machiavelli's play La Mandragola (1518), which received numerous stagings, including several in New York, at the New York Shakespeare Festival in 1976 and the Riverside Shakespeare Company in 1979, as a musical comedy by Peer Raben in Munich's antiteater in 1971, and at London's National Theatre in 1984.

"Machiavellian" 

Machiavelli is most famous for a short political treatise, The Prince, written in 1513 but not published until 1532, five years after his death. Although he privately circulated The Prince among friends, the only theoretical work to be printed in his lifetime was The Art of War, which was about military science. Since the 16th century, generations of politicians remain attracted and repelled by its neutral acceptance, and also positive encouragement, of the amorality of powerful men, described especially in The Prince but also in his other works.

His works are sometimes even said to have contributed to the modern negative connotations of the words politics and politician, and it is sometimes thought that it is because of him that Old Nick became an English term for the Devil. More obviously, the adjective Machiavellian became a term describing a form of politics that is "marked by cunning, duplicity, or bad faith". Machiavellianism also remains a popular term used casually in political discussions, often as a byword for bare-knuckled political realism.

While Machiavellianism is notable in the works of Machiavelli, scholars generally agree that his works are complex and have equally influential themes within them. For example, J.G.A.  saw him as a major source of the republicanism that spread throughout England and North America in the 17th and 18th centuries and Leo , whose view of Machiavelli is quite different in many ways, had similar remarks about Machiavelli's influence on republicanism and argued that even though Machiavelli was a teacher of evil he had a "grandeur of vision" that led him to advocate immoral actions. Whatever his intentions, which are still debated today, he has become associated with any proposal where "the end justifies the means". For example, Leo  wrote:

In popular culture
In English Renaissance theatre (Elizabethan and Jacobian), the term "Machiavel" (from 'Nicholas Machiavel', an "anglicization" of Machiavelli's name based on French) was used for a stock antagonist that resorted to ruthless means to preserve the power of the state, and is now considered a synonym of "Machiavellian".

Christopher Marlowe's play The Jew of Malta (ca. 1589) contains a prologue by a character called Machiavel, a Senecan ghost based on Machiavelli. Machiavel expresses the cynical view that power is amoral, saying "I count religion but a childish toy,/And hold there is no sin but ignorance."

Somerset Maugham's last book Then and Now fictionalizes Machiavelli's interactions with Cesare Borgia, which formed the foundation of The Prince.

Niccolò Machiavelli plays a vital role in the young adult book series The Secrets of the Immortal Nicholas Flamel by Michael Scott. He is immortal, and is working in national security for the French government.

Niccolò Machiavelli aids Cesare Borgia and protagonist Nicholas Dawson in their dangerous intrigues in Cecelia Holland's 1979 historical novel City of God. David Maclaine writes that in the novel, Machiavelli "is an off-stage presence whose spirit permeates this work of intrigue and betrayal ... It is a brilliant introduction to the people and events that gave us the word 'Machiavellian.'" Machiavelli appears as an Immortal adversary of Duncan MacLeod in Nancy Holder's 1997 Highlander novel The Measure of a Man, and is a character in Michael Scott's novel series The Secrets of the Immortal Nicholas Flamel (2007–2012). Machiavelli is also one of the main characters in The Enchantress of Florence (2008)  by Salman Rushdie, mostly referred to as "Niccolò 'il Macchia", and the central protagonist in the 2012 novel The Malice of Fortune by Michael Ennis.

Television dramas centring on the early Renaissance have also made use of Machiavelli to underscore his influence in early modern political philosophy. Machiavelli has been featured as a supporting character in The Tudors (2007–2010), Borgia (2011–2014) and The Borgias (2011–2013), and the 1981 BBC mini series The Borgias.

Machiavelli appears in the popular historical video games Assassin's Creed II (2009) and Assassin's Creed: Brotherhood (2010), in which he is portrayed as a member of the secret society of Assassins.

A highly fictionalised version of Machiavelli appears in the BBC children's TV series Leonardo (2011–2012), in which he is "Mac", a black streetwise hustler who is best friends with fellow teenagers Leonardo da Vinci, Mona Lisa, and Lorenzo di Medici. In the 2013 episode "Ewings Unite!" of the television series Dallas, legendary oil baron J. R. Ewing wills his copy of The Prince to his adopted nephew Christopher Ewing, telling him to "use it, because being smart and sneaky is an unbeatable combination." In Da Vinci's Demons (2013–2015) – an American historical fantasy drama series that presents a fictional account of Leonardo da Vinci's early life – Eros Vlahos plays a young Niccolò "Nico" Machiavelli, although the character's full name is not revealed until the finale of the second season.

The 1967 The Time Tunnel episode "The Death Merchant" stars character actor Malachi Throne as Niccolò Machiavelli, who has been time-displaced to the Battle of Gettysburg. The character's personality and behaviour seem to portray Cesare Borgia rather than Machiavelli himself, suggesting that the writers may have confused the two.

Machiavelli is played by Damian Lewis in the 2013 BBC radio play The Prince written by Jonathan Myerson. Together with his defence attorney Lucrezia Borgia (Helen McCrory), he presents examples from history to the devil to support his political theories and appeal his sentence in Hell.

The historical novel The City of Man (2009) by author Michael Harrington fully portrays the complex personalities of the two main characters – Girolamo Savonarola and a formative Niccolò Machiavelli – in opposition during the turbulent last decade of 15th-century Florence. The portrayal of Machiavelli draws from his later writings and observations of the chaotic events of his youth before rising from obscurity to be appointed as Second Chancellor of the Florentine Republic at the age of twenty-nine, only one month after Savonarola's execution. Major characters include Lorenzo de' Medici, his son Piero, Michelangelo, Sandro Botticelli, Pico della Mirandola, Marsilio Ficino, Pope Alexander VI (Rodrigo Borgia), Cesare Borgia (model for The Prince), Piero and Tommaso Soderini, Il Cronaca and the diarist, Luca Landucci.

The American rapper Tupac Shakur read Machiavelli while in prison and became greatly influenced by his work. Upon his release from prison, Tupac honoured Machiavelli in 1996 by changing his own rap name from 2Pac to Makaveli.

In the 1993 crime drama A Bronx Tale, local mob boss Sonny tells his young protégé Calogero that while he was doing a 10-year sentence in jail, he passed the time and stayed out of trouble by reading Machiavelli, whom he describes as "a famous writer from 500 years ago". He then tells him how Machiavelli's philosophy, including his famous advice about how it is preferable for a leader to be feared rather than loved if he cannot be both, have made him a successful mob boss.

Machiavelli also appears as a young Florentine spy in the third season of Medici, where he is portrayed by Vincenzo Crea. He is addressed as "Nico" in all appearances except the season finale, where he reveals his full name.

Works

Political and historical works

 Discorso sopra le cose di Pisa (1499)
 Del modo di trattare i popoli della Valdichiana ribellati (1502)
 Descrizione del modo tenuto dal Duca Valentino nello ammazzare Vitellozzo Vitelli, Oliverotto da Fermo, il Signor Pagolo e il duca di Gravina Orsini (1502) – A Description of the Methods Adopted by the Duke Valentino when Murdering Vitellozzo Vitelli, Oliverotto da Fermo, the Signor Pagolo, and the Duke di Gravina Orsini
 Discorso sopra la provisione del danaro (1502) – A discourse about the provision of money.
 Ritratti delle cose di Francia (1510) – Portrait of the affairs of France.
 Ritracto delle cose della Magna (1508–1512) – Portrait of the affairs of Germany.
 The Prince (1513) 
 Discourses on Livy (1517)
 Dell'Arte della Guerra (1519–1520) – The Art of War, high military science.
 Discorso sopra il riformare lo stato di Firenze (1520) – A discourse about the reforming of Florence.
 Sommario delle cose della citta di Lucca (1520) – A summary of the affairs of the city of Lucca.
 The Life of Castruccio Castracani of Lucca (1520) – Vita di Castruccio Castracani da Lucca, a short biography.
 Istorie Fiorentine (1520–1525) – Florentine Histories, an eight-volume history of the city-state Florence, commissioned by Giulio de' Medici, later Pope Clement VII.

Fictional works

Besides being a statesman and political scientist, Machiavelli also translated classical works, and was a playwright (Clizia, Mandragola), a poet (Sonetti, Canzoni, Ottave, Canti carnascialeschi), and a novelist (Belfagor arcidiavolo).

Some of his other work:
 Decennale primo (1506) – a poem in terza rima.
 Decennale secondo (1509) – a poem.
 Andria or The Girl from Andros (1517) – a semi-autobiographical comedy, adapted from Terence.
 Mandragola (1518) – The Mandrake – a five-act prose comedy, with a verse prologue.
 Clizia (1525) – a prose comedy.
 Belfagor arcidiavolo (1515) – a novella.
 Asino d'oro (1517) – The Golden Ass is a terza rima poem, a new version of the classic work by Apuleius.
 Frammenti storici (1525) – fragments of stories.

Other works
Della Lingua (Italian for "On the Language") (1514), a dialogue about Italy's language is normally attributed to Machiavelli.

Machiavelli's literary executor, Giuliano de' Ricci, also reported having seen that Machiavelli, his grandfather, made a comedy in the style of Aristophanes which included living Florentines as characters, and to be titled Le Maschere. It has been suggested that due to such things as this and his style of writing to his superiors generally, there was very likely some animosity to Machiavelli even before the return of the Medici.

See also

 Florentine military reforms
 Francesco Guicciardini
 Francesco Vettori
 Italian Renaissance
 Mayberry Machiavelli
 Republicanism
 Scipione Ammirato

References
Footnotes

Citations

Sources

Further reading

Biographies

 
 Black, Robert. Machiavelli: From Radical to Reactionary. London: Reaktion Books (2022)
 Burd, L. A., "Florence (II): Machiavelli" in Cambridge Modern History (1902), vol. I, ch. vi. pp. 190–218 online Google edition
 Capponi, Niccolò. An Unlikely Prince: The Life and Times of Machiavelli (Da Capo Press; 2010) 334 pages
 Celenza, Christopher S. Machiavelli: A Portrait (Cambridge, Massachusetts: Harvard University Press, 2015) 240 pages. 
 
 , an intellectual biography that won the Pulitzer Prize; excerpt and text search 
 Hale, J. R. Machiavelli and Renaissance Italy (1961) online edition 
 Hulliung, Mark. Citizen Machiavelli (Oxfordshire, UK: Routledge, 1983)
 Lee, Alexander. Machiavelli: His Life and Times (London: Picador, 2020)
 Oppenheimer, Paul. Machiavelli: A Life Beyond Ideology (London; New York: Continuum, 2011) 
 Ridolfi, Roberto. The Life of Niccolò Machiavelli (1963)
 Schevill, Ferdinand. Six Historians (1956), pp. 61–91
 Skinner, Quentin. Machiavelli, in Past Masters series. Oxford, UK: Oxford University Press, 1981. pp. vii, 102.  pbk.
 Skinner, Quentin. Machiavelli: A Very Short Introduction (2d ed., 2019)  pbk.
 Unger, Miles J. Machiavelli: A Biography (Simon & Schuster, 2011)
 Villari, Pasquale. The Life and Times of Niccolò Machiavelli (2 vols. 1892) (Vol 1; Vol 2)
  excerpt and text search 
 Viroli, Maurizio. Machiavelli (1998) online edition 
 Vivanti, Corrado. Niccolò Machiavelli: An Intellectual Biography (Princeton University Press; 2013) 261 pages

Political thought

 Baron, Hans. The Crisis of the Early Italian Renaissance: Civic Humanism and Republican Liberty in an Age of Classicism and Tyranny (2 vol 1955), highly influential, deep study of civic humanism (republicanism); 700 pp.  excerpts and text search; ACLS E-books; also vol 2 in ACLS E-books
 Baron, Hans. In Search of Florentine Civic Humanism (2 vols. 1988).
  in JSTOR 
 
 
 
 Chabod, Federico (1958). Machiavelli & the Renaissance online edition ; online from ACLS E-Books 
 Connell, William J. (2001), "Machiavelli on Growth as an End," in Anthony Grafton and J.H.M. Salmon, eds., Historians and Ideologues: Essays in Honor of Donald R. Kelley, Rochester: University of Rochester Press, 259–277.
 Donskis, Leonidas, ed. (2011). Niccolò Machiavelli: History, Power, and Virtue. Rodopi, E-
 Everdell, William R. "Niccolò Machiavelli: The Florentine Commune" in The End of Kings: A History of Republics and Republicans. Chicago: University of Chicago Press, 2000. 
 
 
 
 
 Gilbert, Felix. Machiavelli and Guicciardini: Politics and History in Sixteenth-Century Italy (2nd ed. 1984) online from ACLS-E-books 
 Gilbert, Felix. "Machiavelli: The Renaissance of the Art of War," in Edward Mead Earle, ed. The Makers of Modern Strategy (1944)
 Jensen, De Lamar, ed. Machiavelli: Cynic, Patriot, or Political Scientist? (1960) essays by scholars online edition 
 
 
 Mansfield, Harvey C. "Machiavelli's Political Science," The American Political Science Review, Vol. 75, No. 2 (Jun. 1981), pp. 293–305 in JSTOR 
 
 
 Mansfield, Harvey C.  Machiavelli's Virtue (1996), 371 pp.
 Mansfield, Harvey C. Machiavelli's New Modes and Orders: A Study of the Discourses on Livy (2001) excerpt and text search 
  See also NYT book review .
  Also available in Chinese, Japanese, German, Portuguese, and Korean. See also NYT book review .
 
 
 
 
 
  
  new ed. 2003, a highly influential study of Discourses and its vast influence; excerpt and text search ; also online 1975 edition 
 Pocock, J. G. A. "The Machiavellian Moment Revisited: a Study in History and Ideology.: Journal of Modern History 1981 53(1): 49–72. Fulltext: in Jstor .
  online edition 
  Excerpt, reviews and Text search shows Machiavelli's Discourses had a major impact on shaping conservative thought.
 Ruggiero, Guido. Machiavelli in Love: Sex, Self and Society in Renaissance Italy (2007)
 .
 
 Skinner, Quentin. The Foundations of Modern Political Thought, v. I, The Renaissance, (1978)
 
 Stanford Encyclopedia of Philosophy. Niccolò Machiavelli (2005)
 
 
 
 
 von Vacano, Diego, "The Art of Power: Machiavelli, Nietzsche and the Making of Aesthetic Political Theory," Lanham MD: Lexington: 2007.
 .
 
 
 Zuckert, Catherine, (2017) "Machiavelli's Politics"

Italian studies

 Barbuto, Marcelo (2005), "Questa oblivione delle cose. Reflexiones sobre la cosmología de Maquiavelo (1469–1527)," Revista Daimon, 34, Universidad de Murcia, pp. 34–52.
 Barbuto, Marcelo (2008), "Discorsi, I, XII, 12–14. La Chiesa romana di fronte alla republica cristiana", Filosofia Politica, 1, Il Mulino, Bologna, pp. 99–116.
 Celli, Carlo ( 2009), Il carnevale di Machiavelli, Firenze, L.S. Olschki. 
 Connell, William J. (2015), Machiavelli nel Rinascimento italiano, Milano, Franco Angeli.
 Giuseppe Leone, "Silone e Machiavelli. Una scuola...che non crea prìncipi", pref. di Vittoriano Esposito, Centro Studi Ignazio Silone, Pescina, 2003.
 Martelli, Mario (2004), "La Mandragola e il suo prologo", Interpres, XXIII, pp. 106–42.
 Martelli, Mario (2003), "Per la definizione della nozione di principe civile", Interpres, XXII.
 Martelli, Mario (2001), "I dettagli della filologia", Interpres XX, pp. 212–71.
 Martelli, Mario (1999a), "Note su Machiavelli", Interpres XVIII, pp. 91–145.
 Martelli, Mario (1999b), Saggio sul Principe, Salerno Editrice, Roma.
 Martelli, Mario (1999c), "Machiavelli e Savonarola: valutazione politica e valutazione religiosa", Girolamo Savonarola. L´uomo e il frate". Atti del xxxv Convegno storico internazionale (Todi, II-14 ottobre 1998), CISAM, Spoleto, pp. 139–53.
 Martelli, Mario (1998a), Machiavelli e gli storici antichi, osservazioni su alcuni luoghi dei discorsi sopra la prima deca di Tito Livio, Quaderni di Filologia e critica, 13, Salerno Editrice, Roma.
 Martelli, Mario (1998b), "Machiavelli politico amante poeta", Interpres XVII, pp. 211–56.
 Martelli, Mario (1998c), "Machiavelli e Savonarola", Savonarola. Democrazia, tirannide, profezia, a cura di G.C. Garfagnini, Florencia, Sismel-Edizioni del Galluzo, pp. 67–89.
 Martelli, Mario and Bausi, Francesco (1997), "Politica, storia e letteratura: Machiavelli e Guicciardini", Storia della letteratura italiana, E. Malato (ed.), vol. IV. Il primo Cinquecento, Salerno Editrice, Roma, pp. 251–320.
 Martelli, Mario (1985–1986), "Schede sulla cultura di Machiavelli", Interpres VI, pp. 283–330.
 Martelli, Mario (1982) "La logica provvidenzialistica e il capitolo XXVI del Principe", Interpres IV, pp. 262–384.
 Martelli, Mario (1974), "L´altro Niccolò di Bernardo Machiavelli", Rinascimento, XIV, pp. 39–100.
 Sasso, Gennaro (1993), Machiavelli: storia del suo pensiero politico, II vol., Bologna, Il Mulino,
 Sasso, Gennaro (1987–1997) Machiavelli e gli antichi e altri saggi, 4 vols., Milano, R. Ricciardi

Editions

Collections
 Gilbert, Allan H. ed. Machiavelli: The Chief Works and Others, (3 vol. 1965), the standard scholarly edition
 Bondanella, Peter, and Mark Musa, eds. The Portable Machiavelli (1979)
 Penman, Bruce. The Prince and Other Political Writings, (1981)
  excerpt and text search 

The Prince
 . Translated by William J. Connell
 . Edited by W. Garner. Translated by Luigi Ricci. Excerpt and text search 
 . Translated by George Bull
 . Translated by Tim Parks
 . Translated by Robert M. Adams (Norton Critical Edition, 2nd ed., with "Backgrounds, Interpretations, Marginalia").
 . Translated into Spanish by Marina Massa-Carrara
 . Translated by Harvey Mansfield
 . Translated and Edited by Stephen J. Milner. Introduction, Notes and other critical apparatus by J.M. Dent.
 The Prince ed. by Peter Bondanella (1998) 101 pp online edition 
 The Prince ed. by Rufus Goodwin and Benjamin Martinez (2003) excerpt and text search 
 The Prince (2007) excerpt and text search 
 Machiavelli, Niccolò. The Prince, (1908 edition tr by W. K. Marriott) Gutenberg edition 
  
 Il principe (2006) ed. by Mario Martelli and Nicoletta Marcelli, Edizione Nazionale delle Opere di Niccolò Machiavelli, Salerno Editrice, Roma.

The Discourses on Livy
 Discorsi sopra la prima deca di Tito Livio (2001), ed. by Francesco Bausi, Edizione Nazionale delle Opere di Niccolò Machiavelli, II vol. Salerno Editrice, Roma.
 The Discourses, online 1772 edition 
 The Discourses, tr. with introduction and notes by L. J. Walker (2 vol 1950).
 Machiavelli, Niccolò (1531). The Discourses. Translated by Leslie J. Walker, S.J, revisions by Brian Richardson (2003). London: Penguin Books. 
 The Discourses, edited with an introduction by Bernard Crick (1970).

The Art of War
 The Seven Books on the Art of War online 1772 edition 
 The Art of War, University of Chicago Press, edited with new translation and commentary by Christopher Lynch (2003)
 The Art of War online 1775 edition
 The Art of War, Niccolò Machiavelli. Da Capo press edition, 2001, with introduction by Neal Wood.

Florentine Histories
 History of Florence online 1901 edition 
 Reform of Florence online 1772 edition 
 . Translation by Laura F. Banfield and Harvey Mansfield, Jr.

Correspondence
 Epistolario privado. Las cartas que nos desvelan el pensamiento y la personalidad de uno de los intelectuales más importantes del Renacimiento, Juan Manuel Forte (edición y traducción), Madrid, La Esfera de los Libros, 2007, 435 págs, 
 The Private Correspondence of Niccolò Machiavelli, ed. by Orestes Ferrara; (1929) online edition 
 . Translated and edited by James B. Atkinson and David Sices.
 Also see .

Poetry and comedy
  Bilingual edition of The Woman from Andros, The Mandrake, and Clizia, edited by David Sices and James B. Atkinson.
 Hoeges, Dirk. Niccolò Machiavelli. Dichter-Poeta. Mit sämtlichen Gedichten, deutsch/italienisch. Con tutte le poesie, tedesco/italiano, Reihe: Dialoghi/Dialogues: Literatur und Kultur Italiens und Frankreichs, Band 10, Peter Lang Verlag, Frankfurt/M. u.a. 2006, .

External links

 
 
 
 
 
 Niccolò Machiavelli | Biography | Encyclopedia Britannica
 Machiavelli, Niccolò- Internet Encyclopedia of Philosophy.
 
 Niccolò Machiavelli, History.com
 William R. Everdell's article "From State to Free-State: The Meaning of the Word Republic from Jean Bodin to John Adams" with extensive discussion of Machiavelli
 Works by Niccolò Machiavelli: text, concordances and frequency list
 * Works of Machiavelli: Italian and English text
 Machiavelli and the Italian City on the BBC's In Our Time with Melvyn Bragg; with Quentin Skinner, Regius Professor of History at the University of Cambridge; Evelyn Welch, Professor of Renaissance Studies at Queen Mary, University of London; Lisa Jardine, Director of the Centre for Editing Lives and Letters at Queen Mary, University of London
 University of Adelaide's full texts of Machiavelli's works

 
Italian political philosophers
Italian Renaissance writers
Italian classical liberals
1469 births
1527 deaths
Burials at Basilica of Santa Croce, Florence
Consequentialists
Italian dramatists and playwrights
15th-century Italian philosophers
16th-century Italian philosophers
Italian political writers
Italian military writers
Military theorists
15th-century people of the Republic of Florence
16th-century people of the Republic of Florence
Philosophers of war
Political realists
Politicians from Florence
16th-century dramatists and playwrights
16th-century male writers
Writers from Florence
15th-century Italian historians
16th-century Italian historians